Cedar Falls High School is a high school located in Cedar Falls, Iowa. It is a part of Cedar Falls Community School District.

The school principal is Jason Wedgebury. The associate principals are Rafael Benítez and Lindsay Spears. All three are University of Northern Iowa graduates. Mr. Wedgebury replaced Rich Powers in July 2014. Troy Becker is the Activities Director and won Northeast Athletic Director of the Year in 2022. The school serves 1,148 students, and 90 teachers.

History

Founding 
In 1846, Mrs. Jackson Taylor opened the first school in her home at Waterloo Road and East 13th Streets. Early residents recalled seeing parents escort their children to school because Native Americans living in the area were sighted in the woods near the Taylor home.  Today, a light red marker commemorates the site of the Taylor home.

In 1863, the old Central School was constructed to serve grades K-12 which occupied an entire city block. In the 1890s, the name was changed to Lincoln School.

First high school 
In 1900, Cedar Falls High School was constructed as the first separate high school in Cedar Falls. The building was located where the Cedar Falls Recreation Center currently resides. An addition was added in 1914, and this building was used until 1953.

Current facility 
The current building, located at 1015 Division Street, was opened in 1954. The school has been partially remodeled, including a new English wing that completed construction in 2005.  The school recently added a plaza in front of the building in remembrance of the September 11 attacks.

Facilities 
CFHS consists of three buildings: the main building, the annex which houses metal technology, electronics and auto mechanics classes, and an alternative program on Cedar Heights Drive.

Athletics
 Track & football stadium
 Gymnasium featuring two basketball courts
Academics
 Library
Computers
 1-to-1 Chromebooks
 HP lab in the Library
 Video editing lab in the Video Broadcasting room

Extracurricular activities

Music 
The choral music department offers three choirs for students during the school day: a select concert choir, a Women's choir, known as Treble Clef Choir, and Men's choir, known as Bass Clef Choir. A Vocal Jazz group is offered to students by audition.  The choirs perform three concerts during the school year as well as participate in various festivals and contests throughout the year. Students are also encouraged to participate in all-state, solo/ensemble, and a variety of community functions throughout the year.

The instrumental music department includes marching band, two concert bands, two jazz bands, and pep band.  Band students regularly earn top honors in all large ensemble categories at festivals, and also participate in all of the state-sanctioned festivals. 

The orchestral music department offers string orchestra throughout the year, and full orchestra (winds and percussion) is offered from mid-October through May.  In addition, a chamber orchestra is formed for different concerts as needed.  All of the orchestra groups have earned top marks at the IHSMA music festivals, and maintain a strong level of participation in all-state and solo/ensemble festival opportunities.

Athletics 

The athletic teams are known as the Tigers. CFHS is a member of the Mississippi Valley Conference and competes at the Class 4A (largest) level in the state of Iowa. Major rivals include the Waterloo West Wahawks and the Waterloo East Trojans. A budding rivalry on the gridiron is also enjoyed by fans of Cedar Falls and Iowa City High School. The Tigers are one of two teams in the state of Iowa that plays home football games indoors. Contrary to other Tiger athletic squads, the football team has no black on the uniforms.

On Thursday, February 17, 2011, Cassy Harkelman became the first female wrestler to win an Iowa state tournament match in the history of Iowa high school wrestling. She earned a 20-13 pre-tournament record at 112 pounds before receiving an opening-round default at the state tournament. Cassy was joined by another female wrestler in 2011 as the only female wrestlers to qualify for the state tournament since its inception by the Iowa High School Athletic Association in 1926.

State championships 

 Girls' Swimming: 9-time State Champions - 1986, 1993, 1994, 1995, 1996, 1997, 1998, 2003, 2004
 Boys' Swimming: 5-time State Champions - 1993, 1998, 2004, 2005, 2006
 Wrestling: 5-time State Champions (all 3A, except 1968) - 1968 (AA), 1976, 1993, 1997, 1998
 Girls' Golf: 4-time State Champions - 1975, 2011(4A), 2016(5A), 2017(5A)
 Boys' Cross Country: 3-time Class 4A State Champions - 1969, 2004, 2005
 Boys' Basketball: 2-time Class 4A State Champions - 2018, 2019
 Girls' Basketball: 1991 (5v5), 2001 (Class 4A) 
 Volleyball: 2-time Class 5A State Champions - 2017, 2019
 Boys' Bowling: 2000, 2016 Class 3A State Champions
 Girls' Bowling: 1991
 Football: 1986 Class 4A State Champions
 Girls' Cross Country: 1996 Class 3A State Champions
 Boys' Track and Field: 2011 Class 4A State Champions
 Girls' Track and Field: 1995 Indoor State Champions

Notable alumni 

 Travis Fulton — Mixed Martial Arts fighter and professional boxer
 Gil Gutknecht — Former U.S. congressman from Minnesota
 Roger Jepsen — Former U.S. Senator
 Matt Wagner, former MLB player, (Seattle Mariners)
 Michael Mosley — Actor
 Ike Boettger — NFL player, (Buffalo Bills)
 Ross Pierschbacher — NFL player, (Washington Redskins)
 Jack Campbell — football player, (Iowa Hawkeyes Football)
 George Kittle — NFL player, (San Francisco 49ers)

See also 
 Cedar Falls, Iowa
 Cedar Falls Community School District
 List of high schools in Iowa

References

Sources 
 Brian C. Collins. Images of America: Cedar Falls, Iowa. Arcadia Publishing, Inc. 1998.  

Educational institutions established in 1900
Public high schools in Iowa
Iowa High School Athletic Association
Buildings and structures in Cedar Falls, Iowa
Schools in Black Hawk County, Iowa
1900 establishments in Iowa